Kenneth Jennings (born 25 August 1953) is a South African former cricketer who played five first-class matches for Northerns between 1981 and 1983.

References

External links
 

1953 births
Living people
South African cricketers
Northerns cricketers
People from Vanderbijlpark
Sportspeople from Gauteng